Matheus de Vargas (born 18 June 1996), known as Matheus Vargas, is a Brazilian footballer who plays for Sport, on loan from Fortaleza as a central midfielder.

Club career
Born in Cláudia, Mato Grosso, Vargas represented Rio Preto, União Barbarense, Santo André and Audax as a youth. Ahead of the 2014 campaign, he was loaned to partner team Audax Rio for the year's Campeonato Carioca.

Vargas made his senior debut on 20 February 2014, coming on as a half-time substitute for Guilherme in a 2–1 home win against Boavista, and scored his first goal six days later by netting the opener in a 5–3 home loss against Bonsucesso. After featuring regularly, he moved to Corinthians in September, returning to the youth setup.

In 2016, after his loan with Timão expired, Vargas moved to Oeste also in a temporary deal, as the club reached a partnership with Audax. He returned to his parent club for the 2017 season, but was loaned to Superleague Greece side Kerkyra in June of that year.

In September 2018, Vargas joined Ponte Preta on loan until the following April. His loan was later extended, but on 6 September of the following year, he agreed to a permanent two-year deal with Fortaleza.

Vargas made his Série A debut on 15 September 2019, replacing Osvaldo in a 1–1 away draw against Bahia. On 30 December, after only two top tier appearances, he was loaned to fellow league team Atlético Goianiense for the 2020 campaign.

Honours
Corinthians
 Copa São Paulo de Futebol Júnior: 2015
 Campeonato Brasileiro Série A: 2015

Atlético Goianiense
 Campeonato Goiano: 2020

Fortaleza
Campeonato Cearense: 2021, 2022
Copa do Nordeste: 2022

References

External links
Think Ball profile 

1996 births
Living people
Sportspeople from Mato Grosso
Brazilian footballers
Association football midfielders
Campeonato Brasileiro Série A players
Campeonato Brasileiro Série B players
Campeonato Brasileiro Série D players
Grêmio Osasco Audax Esporte Clube players
Audax Rio de Janeiro Esporte Clube
Sport Club Corinthians Paulista players
Oeste Futebol Clube players
Associação Atlética Ponte Preta players
Fortaleza Esporte Clube players
Atlético Clube Goianiense players
Sport Club do Recife players
Super League Greece players
PAE Kerkyra players
Brazilian expatriate footballers
Brazilian expatriate sportspeople in Greece
Expatriate footballers in Greece